Woomera originally refers to:
 Woomera (spear-thrower), an Indigenous Australian spear-throwing tool

Woomera may also refer to:

Places

Australia

South Australia
RAAF Woomera Range Complex, a major Australian military and civil aerospace facility and operation
RAAF Base Woomera, an operational Royal Australian Air Force military airbase located within the RAAF Woomera Range Complex
Woomera Launch Area 5, a rocket launch site on the RAAF Woomera Range Complex
Woomera Immigration Reception and Processing Centre (IRPC), a former immigration detention centre
Woomera, South Australia, a gazetted locality; also known as "Woomera Village"

Elsewhere
11195 Woomera, a main-belt asteroid discovered in 1999
Woomera (crater), a crater on Mars

Technology
Woomera protocol, is a VoIP tool allowing support of multiple VoIP protocols

Military 
CAC Woomera, a prototype bomber aircraft designed by Commonwealth Aircraft Corporation during World War II
, a vessel used for carrying armament and stores; in service from 1945 to 1960

See also